Yasur was a Palestinian village, located 40 kilometres northeast of Gaza, that was depopulated during the 1948 Arab–Israeli War. Its inhabitants fled a military assault by the First Battalion of Israel's Givati Brigade on 9 June 1948, part of Operation Barak.

The village consisted of an estimated 244 houses, an elementary school for boys, and a village mosque. Following the war the area was incorporated into the State of Israel and Talmei Yehiel and Bnei Ayish were established on the former lands of Yasur. The ruins of the built area of the village were demolished, and the site is today located in an industrial park between Bnei Ayish and the Hatzor Airbase.

History
Ceramics from the Byzantine times have been found at Yasur.

During the Mamluk period (1205-1517), a mail station between Gaza and Damascus was located in Yasur, although this was later transferred to the village of Bayt Daras.

Ottoman era
It was incorporated into the Ottoman Empire in 1517 with the rest of Palestine, and in the 1596 tax records it was located in the  nahiya (subdistrict) of Gaza   part of Sanjak of Gaza, with 55 all Muslim households, an estimated population of 303. The villagers paid a fixed tax rate of 25%  for the crops that they cultivated, which included wheat, barley, fruit, and sesame as well as on other types of property, such as goats, beehives and water buffaloes, a total of   16,000 akçe. All of the revenue went to a Muslim charitable institution.

James Turner Barclay mentions passing Yasur, Bayt Dajan and al-Sarafand, on his travels between Jaffa and Haifa in The City of the Great King: Or, Jerusalem as it Was, as it Is, and as it is, 1858.

In 1863, French explorer Victor Guérin found the village situated on a hill and containing 450 villagers. The houses were built with sun baked bricks, and surrounded by tobacco plantations and olives. The only ancient remains he saw was a column of mutilated, gray-white marble near a well. An Ottoman village list from about 1870 found that Jasur had a population of 103, in 72 houses, though the population count included men, only.

In 1882 the PEF's Survey of Western Palestine described Yasur as an "ordinary adobe village"". It had a well to the south and large gardens to the north and east.

Yasur was also mentioned in The Life and Letters of Thomas Hodgkin (1918).

British Mandate era
In the 1922 census of Palestine conducted by the British Mandate authorities, Yasur had a population of 456 inhabitants, all Muslims. In the 1931 census, Yasur had 129 occupied houses and a population of 648 Muslims, 5 Christians and 1 Jew.

In the 1945 statistics the population of Yasur consisted of 1,070 Muslims and the total land area was 16,390 dunams, according to an official land and population survey. Of this, Arabs used 636 dunams for citrus and bananas, 
180 for plantations and irrigable land, 12,173 for cereals, while 35 dunams were built-up areas.

1948 and after
In early 1949 it was reported that many of the residents of Yazur were living in tents in what became Maghazi refugee camp in the Gaza Strip.
According to Walid Khalidi, 1992:"The village is a closed, fenced-in military zone. At the village entrance there is a sign: 'TAT Aircraft Parts Industrial Firm.' A single undemolished house stands some 10 m away from the entrance. Next to it is a demolished one and a number of cactuses. A dirt road, lined by cactuses and olive and almond trees, passes by the southern boundary of the fence. The area inside and outside the fence has also been planted with eucalyptus trees"

See also
 Yas'ur
 Depopulated Palestinian locations in Israel

References

Bibliography

 
 

 
 ( p. 64)

 

 (pp. 179, 260)

External links
Welcome To Yasur
Yasur, Zochrot
Survey of Western Palestine, Map 16: IAA, Wikimedia commons
Yasur from the Khalil Sakakini Cultural Center

District of Gaza
Arab villages depopulated during the 1948 Arab–Israeli War